Eye to Eye is a 1997 young adult science fiction novel by Catherine Jinks. It follows the story of Jansi who while scavenging in the desert comes across a damaged star ship which contains a computer that has the ability to project thought, expression and friendship.

Background
Eye to Eye was first published in Australia in 1997 by Puffin Books in trade paperback format and by Bolinda Publishing as an audiobook. It was also released in the United Kingdom in 1997 in hardback format. Eye to Eye was a joint winner, along with Isobelle Carmody's Greylands, of the 1997 Aurealis Award for best young-adult novel.

Awards

 Won - CBCA Children's Book of the Year Award: Older Readers (1998)

References

1997 Australian novels
Australian science fiction novels
1997 science fiction novels
Children's science fiction novels
Australian young adult novels
Novels by Catherine Jinks
Aurealis Award-winning works
CBCA Children's Book of the Year Award-winning works
1997 children's books